The Peace and Justice Project is a left-wing British private limited company founded by the former leader of the Labour Party, Jeremy Corbyn. In 2022, The Sunday Telegraph said that there were calls for the company to be established as a new political party in the United Kingdom.

Background 

In April 2020, Keir Starmer became the leader of the Labour Party. Starmer was seen as a more centrist figure than his predecessor as Labour leader, Jeremy Corbyn.

In October 2020, the former Corbyn was suspended from the Labour Party for saying that allegations of antisemitism within the party were exaggerated by political opponents on the right-wing of the party.

Project founding 
On 13 December 2020, Jeremy Corbyn announced the project, and said that its areas of focus will include environmentalism, international peace cooperation, poverty, social inequality and corporation power. Corbyn launched the project on 17 January 2021, and its affiliates include Christine Blower, Len McCluskey and Zarah Sultana. Rafael Correa said that he "welcome[d] the creation" of the project.

Spoof site 
On 15 December 2020, The Times of Israel reported that a satirical website claiming to be the Project for Peace and Justice had been set up "by critics of Corbyn, and they are using it to mock him for his strident criticism of Israel and alleged soft-pedaling of anti-Semitism in Labour's ranks".

Conversion into a new political party 
In January 2022, The Sunday Telegraph said that Corbyn was urged to make the project become a new political party that will stand in elections to the left of Labour. This urging has come from close political confidants, as well as his wife Laura.

See also 
 Momentum (organisation)
 List of organisations associated with the Labour Party (UK)

References

External links
Official website

2020 establishments in the United Kingdom

Organisations associated with the Labour Party (UK)
Labour Party (UK) factions
Left-wing politics in the United Kingdom
Jeremy Corbyn
Progressive International